Burra Venkatesham Goud (born 10 April 1968) is an officer of the Indian Administrative Service (IAS) and the author of Selfie of Success (2019). He is from Jangam, Telangana, India.

Early life 
Venkatesham was born in Jangam, Telangana in an economically disadvantaged family. He was the first person in the family to receive education.

Education 
Venkatesham completed his BA from the Dr. B.R. Ambedkar College, Hyderabad, in 1989 and LLB from Osmania University, Hyderabad, in 1992. He is an alumnus of Andhra Pradesh Residential School, Sarvail, Telangana.

Career 
Venkatesham became an officer of the Indian administrative service in 1995 from the Telangana cadre. He was the District Collector of the Medak district from 2005 to 2008, during which the administration was awarded the SA8000 certificate by the Social Accountability International, New York. The Medak administration was the first in Asia to receive the certificate. His experience as the District Collector was written about by the 11th President of India, A.P.J Abdul Kalam, in his book, Pathways to Greatness: Coming Together for Change.

In February 2014, the then Chief Secretary to Andhra Pradesh, Pradip Kumar Mohanty, appointed Venkatesham as part of the three-member team of senior IAS officers for the Andhra Pradesh Reorganisation Committee. For the implementation of the Andhra Pradesh Reorganisation Act, 2014, he was responsible for the Agriculture, Horticulture, Sericulture, Civil Supplies, Animal Husbandry, Fisheries and Dairy Development, Backward Castes Welfare, Minorities Welfare, Social Welfare, Tribal Welfare, and Rain Shadow Area Development Secretariat departments. His role was also to support the Services and Procedures, Educational Institutions, and Medical Institutions committees under the General Administration (SR) Department. He is the first Home Secretary of Telangana state.

He is the secretary to the Government of Telangana for Youth Advancement, Tourism and Culture (YAT&C) department since 2015. He is the Secretary to the Backward Class Welfare department, the Chairman of the Chitramayee State Art Gallery, the Chairman of National Institute of Tourism and Hospitality Management, a part of the Management team of Telangana Tourism, and was the Chairman of Society for Employment Promotion & Training in Twin Cities (SETWIN)

As the secretary of Culture, Venkatesham organized International Sweets Festival in Hyderabad and the International Snacks Festival in collaboration with Hyderabad Metro.

Public activities 

Bathukamma on water
International Kite Festival
 Key organizer of World Telugu Conference
 Restoration of Qutub Shahi tombs
 Tobacco free tourist spots in Telangana
 Ramappa Temple as UNESCO World Heritage Sites in India
Key organizer of the 31st Hyderabad Book Fair
Cable suspension bridge at Kuntala waterfalls

Literary works 
In 2019, Venkatesham authored the book, Selfie of Success. He was felicitated by V. Srinivas Goud, the minister for Tourism, for writing the book.
Selfie of Success
Gelupu Pilupu
Jeevana Dhanya Shathakam
Buddham Saranam Gacchami
Ramayana Parivaram

Recognition 
In 2019, Venkatesham was named the Person of the Year by the Creative India magazine.

References 

Living people
1968 births
Indian civil servants
Indian writers